The Girl Guides Association of Brunei Darussalam or Persatuan Pandu Puteri Brunei Darussalam is a Guiding organisation in Brunei. Like all Scouting and Guiding organisations, it aims to develop character in children and young people by following Scouting principles. The Girl Guides Association of Brunei Darussalam is a girls and women only organisation. Founded in 1951, it became a full member of the World Association of Girl Guides and Girl Scouts (WAGGGS) in 1996.

Girls are organised in groups by age. These include Brownie groups and Girl Guide groups.

For the International Day of Peace in 2006, the PPP held a fundraising Walk for Peace, raising money for the Yogjakarta earthquake appeal, as well as Sharing for Peace a solidarity camp together with Girl Guides from Singapore who visited Brunei Darussalam for six days in September 2006.

Stamps

Girl Guides and Brownies have been featured on two sets of postage stamps issued in Brunei. A set of five stamps celebrates the Guiding movement. Another set, celebrating the International Year Against Drug Trafficking and Abuse, features a Brownie and a Girl Guide on one of the stamps.

See also
Persekutuan Pengakap Negara Brunei Darussalam, the national Scouting organisation of Brunei

References

External links

World Association of Girl Guides and Girl Scouts member organizations
Scouting and Guiding in Brunei
Youth organizations established in 1951
1951 establishments in the British Empire